"Night Night Night" is the second single released by Japanese rock band, The Teenage Kissers. The single was released in a special physical edition July 5, 2013 and was distributed only at live shows. The song was later included on the band's second EP, Lightning Machine.

Track list

Personnel
 Nana Kitade – Vocals, Lyrics
 Hideo Nekota – Bass, Music
 Mai Koike – Drums
 Tsubasa Nakada – Guitar
 TEAK - Arrangement

References

External links
 The Teenage Kissers Official Site

2013 songs
2013 singles
Nana Kitade songs
Songs written by Nana Kitade